Gerald Marzenell (born 6 February 1964) is a German former professional tennis player.

A right-handed player from Mannheim, Marzenell played college tennis in the United States at the University of Houston prior to his professional career.

Marzenell reached a career high ranking of 182 in the world and featured in the Wimbledon qualifying draw on two occasions during the late 1980s. His best performance on the Grand Prix circuit came when he defeated Petr Korda to make the round of 16 at the 1988 Dutch Open.

References

External links
 
 

1964 births
Living people
German male tennis players
West German male tennis players
Sportspeople from Mannheim
Houston Cougars men's tennis players
Tennis people from Baden-Württemberg